Nils "Niklas" Skoglund (15 August 1906 – 1 January 1980) was a Swedish diver who won the silver medal in the plain high diving competition at the 1920 Summer Olympics. He still remains the youngest male Olympian to win a medal in an individual event, at 14 years, 11 days.

After the Olympics Skoglund retired from diving and played water polo for his club Stockholms KK. His elder brother Erik competed in swimming at the 1924 Summer Olympics, and the other brother Gunnar was a film actor.

References

1906 births
1980 deaths
Swedish male divers
Olympic divers of Sweden
Divers at the 1920 Summer Olympics
Olympic silver medalists for Sweden
Olympic medalists in diving
Medalists at the 1920 Summer Olympics
Stockholms KK divers
Divers from Stockholm
20th-century Swedish people